The 2023 American Athletic Conference baseball tournament will be held at BayCare Ballpark in Clearwater, Florida, from May 23 through 28. The event, held at the end of the conference regular season, determines the champion of the American Athletic Conference for the 2023 season.  The winner of the double-elimination tournament will receive the conference's automatic bid to the 2023 NCAA Division I baseball tournament.

The Tournament has been held since 2014, the first year of the rebranding as the American Athletic Conference.  Since then, defending champion East Carolina has won three titles, Houston has won the event twice, and among current members Cincinnati and South Florida have each won once.

Format and seeding
The top eight baseball teams in The American will be seeded based on their records in conference play.  The tournament will use a two bracket double-elimination format, leading to a single championship game between the winners of each bracket.

Bracket

References

Tournament
American Athletic Conference Baseball Tournament
American Athletic Conference baseball tournament